Payette Lake is a natural lake in the western United States, located in west central Idaho at McCall. Formed by glacial activity, it is situated in the upper drainage basin of the Payette River, which drains into the Snake River.

Outflow from the lake at its southwest corner is regulated for irrigation purposes by a small dam completed in 1943.

The principal tributary and outlet is the North Fork of the Payette River. Further south, the North Fork flows into Lake Cascade, the reservoir behind Cascade Dam.

History
Prior to the arrival of Euro-American hunters in the 1830s, the area had been inhabited by Native Americans for thousands of years. The discovery of gold in 1862 in the upper drainage of Payette Lake prompted an influx of miners to the area. The townsite of McCall was established on the lake's southern shore in the 1880s. The area became more accessible in 1914 when a railroad and roads were extended to McCall, which was becoming a tourist destination for summer and winter recreation. In 1920, the Idaho State Land Board began leasing vacation homesites around Payette Lake. Increasing recreational demands led to the establishment of Brundage Mountain Ski Area and Ponderosa State Park, both near McCall, in the 1960s.

The large Payette Lakes Club was said to be significant in supporting recreation in the area;  it was built 1914–15, on a knoll overlooking the lake from the west, and served as an inn, casino, and Chautauqua center. It was surrounded by development of many small cabin lots.

In popular culture
In Idaho folklore, a sea serpent much like the Loch Ness Monster is said to live in the deep waters of Payette Lake; in 1954, the creature was given the name Sharlie.

References

External links

Payette Lake Idaho Department of Fish and Game
Geologic Map of McCall (with Payette Lake bathymetry)

Lakes of Idaho
Lakes of Valley County, Idaho